KFOX may refer to:

 KFOX-TV, a television station (channel 14 analog/15 digital) licensed to El Paso, Texas, United States
 KFOX (AM), a radio station (1650 AM) licensed to Torrance, California, United States
 KAFX-FM, a radio station (95.5 FM) licensed to Diboll, Texas, United States, known on the air as KFOX
 KUFX, a radio station (98.5 FM) licensed to San Jose, California, United States, known on the air as KFOX
 KRBQ, a radio station (102.1 FM) licensed to San Francisco, California, United States, which simulcast KUFX from 2011 to 2014
 KFRN, a radio station (1280 AM) licensed to Long Beach, California, which originally held the KFOX calls until 1978 and was portrayed in the 1974 film Gone in 60 Seconds
 KKDZ, a radio station (1250 AM) licensed to Seattle, Washington, United States, which used the branding K-FOX from 1981 to 1993
 KDAY, a radio station (93.5 FM) licensed to Redondo Beach, California, which held the KFOX calls from the 1970s to 1999